Lemyra eximia is a moth of the family Erebidae. It was described by Charles Swinhoe in 1891. It is found in southern India.

References

eximia
Moths described in 1891